DGM Racing (formerly King Autosport) is a Canadian professional stock car racing team that currently competes in the NASCAR Xfinity Series. The team is owned by Mario Gosselin. The team is now located in Lake Wales, Florida,The team formerly fielded a Truck Series team and an ARCA team. Gosselin won 2 ARCA races with the team. The team currently fields 2 Chevrolet Camaros, the  No. 91 full-time for multiple drivers and the No. 92 full-time for Josh Williams. The team also fields the No. 36 Chevrolet Camaro part-time for Alex Labbé.

Xfinity Series

Car No. 36 history

In 2018, it was announced that Alex Labbé would compete full-time in 2018 in the No. 36 Chevrolet with sponsorship from Can-Am.

In 2019 it was announced that Josh Williams would drive the 36 full-time. In May 2019 Williams got his best career finish, finishing 8th at Talladega Superspeedway. Donald Theetge drove the 36 car for one race at Richmond Raceway while Williams drove the 92 car.

In 2020, Labbé returned to the No. 36 for 21 races with some part-time drivers such as Ronnie Bassett Jr., Dexter Bean, Preston Pardus, and Korbin Forrister.

In 2021, Labbé returned to full season in the No. 36 car. He finished 19th in points with three top tens.

In 2022, Josh Bilicki drove the 36 car at Daytona while Labbé would drive for the rest of the season. Garrett Smithley would drive the 36 car at Charlotte.

Car No. 36 Results

Car No. 90 history

In 2013, the team attempted Bristol summer race with Martin Roy but he failed to qualify.

In 2014, the team finally debuted NASCAR Xfinity Series with Martin Roy in 6 races, he make the field in 5 and only failed to qualify at Homestead-Miami Speedway.

In 2015, the team returned with Mario Gosselin and Martin Roy in a full-time schedule. Martin Roy was in the No. 92 for some races. The No. 90 team itself ran full schedule but only 18 races with DGM Racing and the ride was split with SS-Green Light Racing.

In 2016, the No. 90 returned to the NASCAR Xfinity Series once again and is now almost full-time except for 2 races, one fielded once again by SS-Green Light Racing and the other one fielded by B. J. McLeod Motorsports.

In 2017, the team returned full-time again but now only for 21 races with King, and the ride was split with Brandonbilt Motorsports that fielded the car in the other 12.

In 2018, the team split ride with Brandonbilt again. This time Brandonbilt only fielded the car for 7 races while DGM fielded for 26 races.

In 2019, DGM fielded the 90 car full-time by themself. Caesar Bacarella drove for the team for 3 races. At the 2019 U.S. Cellular 250, Dillon Bassett collided with a sweeper while attempting to enter pit road during one of the caution laps. At the 2019 Drive for the Cure 250 Alex Labbé would get the best finish in team history, finishing in 6th place.

In 2020, Bacarella, Bassett, Alex Labbé, Ronnie Bassett Jr., Dexter Bean, Preston Pardus, B. J. McLeod and Donald Theetge split time in the split time in the No. 90. The No. 90 car earned one top 10 finish, with Labbé finishing in 8th at the 2020 Pennzoil 150. 

In 2021, Bacarella, Bean, Pardus, George Gorham Jr., McLeod, Kyle Sieg, Bassett Jr., Loris Hezemans and Spencer Boyd ran the No. 90. The highlight of the year was when Pardus qualified 37th in the Drive for the Cure 250 and finished 7th, the only top 10 of the year in the No. 90.

In 2022, Labbé ran the No. 90 in the 2022 Beef. It's What's for Dinner. 300 before switching over to the No. 36. The No. 90 would return to IRC with Mason Filippi. They DNQ'ed in both attempts.

Car No. 90 Results

Car No. 91 history

In 2020, it was revealed that the team would be fielding a fourth car for the first time, with team owner Mario Gosselin piloting the No. 91 in the season-opener at Daytona for his first Xfinity start as a driver since 2017. It is unclear if the car will attempt additional races throughout the season. Gosselin failed to qualify as rain washed out qualifying. Preston Pardus was to drive the 91 at the Daytona Road Course but was excluded from the field due to the team being outside of the top 35 in owners' points and the lack of qualifying, so he was moved over to the No. 90. Pardus successfully qualified the car at Circuit of the Americas.

For 2022, the 91 car would run full-time with Mason Massey as the primary driver while Preston Pardus would drive the car in the 6 road course events.

Car No. 91 Results

Car No. 92 history

The No. 92 is the second team for DGM Racing and the team was created in 2015. The No. 92 runs a limited schedule with various drivers. This team is sometimes a late-entry to complete the 38-car field, and almost always is a start and park car.

In 2020, it was announced that Josh Williams would drive the 92 full-time. Williams earned his best career finish, finishing 6th at Kansas Speedway.

In 2021, Williams returned for another full-time season.

In 2022, Williams left for B. J. McLeod Motorsports and Kyle Weatherman joined the DGM in the No. 92 for at least five races. On March 28, DGM announced it would scale back the No. 92 to a part-time schedule. A day later, DGM sold the No. 92's points to SS-Green Light Racing for its No. 08 entry.

In 2023, Williams returned to the No. 92 car full-time. At Atlanta, he sustained heavy damage on lap 27; when debris from his repaired car caused another caution, NASCAR parked him under the Damaged Vehicle Policy. In response, Williams stopped his car on the start/finish line and walked back to pit road.

Car No. 92 Results

Camping World Truck Series

Truck No. 12 history
In 2008, DGM fielded the No. 12 Chevrolet Silverado for owner Mario Gosselin. He drove the truck for 6 races. Scotty Crockett competed in 2 races.

In 2009, Gosselin returned to this truck for 14 races. Dexter Bean competed in 2 races  at Dover International Speedway and The Milwaukee Mile. Derek White also competed for 2 races in the 12 truck at Martinsville Speedway and Phoenix Raceway.

In 2010, Gosselin run full-time in the 12 truck after picked up a sponsorship from TireMonkey.com. At the end of the season, Gosselin was forced to sell his owners' points to Johanna Long and her Panhandle Motorsports team for 2011.

In 2012, the 12 truck returned for 1 race with Russ Dugger as the driver.

Truck No. 39 history
In 2013, DGM fielded the No. 39 Chevrolet Silverado at Canadian Tire Motorsport Park with Alex Guenette as the driver. He was running near the top ten until oil line issues hampered Guenette's effort, and he finished 25th.

Truck No. 72 history
In 2009, DGM fielded the No. 72 Chevrolet Silverado part-time. Owner Mario Gosselin drove for 1 race. Clay Rogers also drove for 1 race. Peyton Sellers also made 1 start in this truck. Michelle Theriault made 4 starts with this truck. She failed to qualify at 1 race. John Jackson made 5 starts in the 72 truck.

In 2010, Johnny Chapman drove this truck for 2 races. He failed to qualify at 1 race. Jackson returned to this truck for 4 races. Caitlin Shaw drove the 72 truck at Phoenix International Raceway.

Truck No. 74 history
In 2014, DGM fielded the No. 74 Chevrolet Silverado as a one-off at Martinsville Speedway with Alex Guenette as the driver.

Truck No. 84 history
In 2013, DGM fielded the No. 84 Chevrolet Silverado at Canadian Tire Motorsport Park with Martin Roy as the driver. Roy qualified 21st and finished 14th.

Truck No. 92 history
In 2009, DGM fielded the No. 92 Chevrolet Silverado part-time.
John Jackson made 3 starts in this truck. He failed to qualify at 2 races. Derek White made 1 start in the 92 truck at Homestead Miami Speedway. He failed to qualify for the race.

ARCA Racing Series

In 2002, DGM fielded the No. 12 Chevrolet for owner Mario Gosselin at Pocono Raceway. He finished 3rd.

In 2003, Gosselin attempted to run 5 races in the 12 car. He failed to qualify the race at Charlotte and won the race Nashville.

In 2004, Gosselin only made 1 race in the 12 car at Nashville. He finished 4th.

In 2005, Gosselin made 6 starts in the No. 12 Chevrolet while Dawayne Bryan made 1 start in a Dodge. Burney Lamar also made 1 start in a Chevrolet.

In 2006, Gosselin made 12 starts in the 12 car. He failed to qualify at Winchester Speedway and won a race at Nashville. Gosselin also drove the No. 63 Chevrolet at Kentucky Speedway. He failed to qualify the race. Bryan returned for 2 races with the No. 12 Dodge. Justin Drawdy made 1 start with the No. 12 Chevrolet. Corie Stott made 1 start with the No. 12 Pontiac. Billy Shotko drove for 1 race in a Chevrolet. Billy Leslie made 1 start in a Ford. DGM also fielded the No. 72 Chevrolet for Justin Drawdy at Nashville Superspeedway. Dawayne Bryan made 2 starts in the No. 72 Dodge. John Jackson made 3 starts in the 72 car. He failed to  qualify at 2 races. Amanda Gogel made 1 start in the 72 car. Sisters Angela and Amber Cope both made 1 start in the 72 car. Justin South made 1 start at Talladega Superspeedway in the 72 car.

In 2007, Gosselin returned for 7 races in the No. 12 car. Shotko returned for 1 race at Berlin Raceway. Michael Phelps made 1 start in the 12 car at Toledo Speedway. J.R. Heffner made 1 start at Daytona in the 72 car. He finished 35th. Jackson returned for 4 races in the 72 car. He failed to qualify at 1 race.

In 2008, Alli Owens drove the No. 12 ElectriyingCareers.com Chevrolet. In her twelve races that year, she had a best race finish of 15th place, which she achieved on three separate occasions (Rockingham, Kentucky and Chicago). Bryan returned for 1 race at Daytona in the No. 72 Dodge. Jackson made 1 start at Talladega in the No. 72 Chevrolet.

In 2009, Gosselin made 1 start in the 12 car at Daytona. Darwin Greene made 3 start in the 12 car.

In 2010, Russ Dugger made 3 start in the 12 car.

In 2012, DGM fielded the No. 39 Ford for Fain Skinner  at Daytona International Speedway. Skinner ran a consistent race, but was collected in an accident on the final lap of the event, finished 15th.
 
In 2014, DGM fielded the No. 17 Chevrolet for Alex Guenette at Talladega Superspeedway. He finished 20th, two laps down.

In 2015, DGM fielded the No. 80 Chevrolet for Russ Dugger. Dugger failed to make the race  Daytona. He went on to Talladega that same year and accomplished his career best finish of 5th, and then went to Kansas Speedway and after running as high as fourth late in the race, finished 11th.

In 2016, Dugger returned to Daytona in the 80 car but he failed to make the race again.

In 2018, DGM fielded the No. 71 Toyota for L.B. Skaggs at Pocono Raceway. He finished 14th.

References

External links
 

Canadian auto racing teams
NASCAR teams
Auto racing teams established in 1998